Epacris paludosa, commonly known as swamp heath, is a species of flowering plant from the heath family, Ericaceae, and is endemic to eastern Australia. It is an erect, bushy shrub with lance-shaped, elliptic or egg-shaped leaves and tube-shaped white or cream-coloured flowers in crowded, leafy heads at the ends of branches.

Description
Flowering occurs throughout the year with a peak from September to January.

Taxonomy
Epacris paludosa was first formally described in 1810 by Robert Brown in his Prodromus Florae Novae Hollandiae et Insulae Van Diemen. The specific epithet (paludosa) means "boggy" or "marshy".

Distribution and habitat

Ecology
In the Sydney region, E. paludosa is associated with such plants as native broom (Viminaria juncea), marsh banksia (Banksia paludosa), and woolly teatree Leptospermum lanigerum. Plants live more than 60 years, and resprout after fire.

References 

paludosa
Ericales of Australia
Flora of New South Wales
Flora of the Australian Capital Territory
Flora of Victoria (Australia)
Flora of Tasmania
Plants described in 1810
Taxa named by Robert Brown (botanist, born 1773)